Eyes of Fire (also known as Cry Blue Sky) is a 1983 American folk horror film written and directed by independent filmmaker Avery Crounse.

Plot
The film takes place in the year 1750 on the American frontier during the colonial days, before the United States declared its independence.  The story is told through the viewpoints of Fanny and Meg, a young woman and a child who have been discovered by the French military. They had to flee their settlement after the new preacher, Will Smythe, was accused of having an affair with two women. The first is Fanny's mother Eloise, whose husband is away hunting for food, and another woman, Leah, who is insane. The other settlers wanted to hang them and Will is only saved when his noose rope breaks while Leah is seemingly babbling.

They leave the camp with a few others who were against hanging the preacher: the couple Jewell Buchanan and Margaret Buchanan; their daughter Cathleen; Calvin and his wife, who goes by the name Sister; and their granddaughter Meg. As the group travels farther away from their town, the threat of attack from hostile Native American tribes becomes more prevalent until the group is eventually ambushed.  Calvin does not survive the attack, but the others are protected by Leah, who has used witchcraft to provide their protection.  All the while the others are unaware that Leah is using magic to keep them safe.  The remaining members of the group are forced to abandon their trail along the riverbank, and take cover in the woods far from man-made trails.  At this time, Eloise's husband Marion Dalton returns home to find news that his wife was scheduled to be executed along with Will for adultery and also learns that the two are on the run with others from the town.  Marion pursues and eventually catches up to them.  Leah wanders away from the group for a short while.

By this time the Shawnee Indians have caught up to the group and Marion Dalton, who speaks fluently in many tribal languages, is able to convince the Shawnee to abort the attack, at least for a short while, though Marion is certain the Shawnee will be back in bigger numbers.  Leah returns covered in white feathers and Marion recognizes this as a warning from the Shawnee Indians to other members of the Shawnee tribe not to enter a nearby valley.  Realizing that the Shawnee have superstitions about the valley, Marion leads the group there, knowing that if the Shawnee were to return, they would not follow the pioneers into the valley due to their superstitious fears.

Once the group settles in the deserted valley, they are safe from any and all tribes of Native Americans.  Though the pioneers are no longer under the threat of attack from the Shawnee, they find a young Native American orphan on the outskirts of their camp.  The pioneers are still unnerved by the previous attacks, but reluctantly bring the girl into the camp and care for her.  It seems that only Will is pleased with the orphan's unexpected appearance, and he is delighted at the possibility of baptizing her into Christianity.  Aside from Will, it seems the others in the group are unnerved by the orphan girl's presence.  Leah, who has an extraordinary connection to the supernatural, senses that there is something unusual about the Native American child, and Leah soon begins to have visions as she tries to uncover the motives of the orphan girl.  Fanny disappears soon afterwards and is found unconscious. Marion is able to free her with Leah's help and makes plans to leave, only to have to similarly help Meg. It soon becomes obvious to all but Will that the valley was left alone for a reason. The little girl also shows her true form, an evil spirit born out of the grief and blood of every living thing that was killed. Eloise turns away from the preacher and falls back in love with Marion. Marion is captured by the spirit, as he is a threat to its power and existence. Leah helps him fight back as the spirit narrows in on Fanny and Eloise. He is freed and the spirit mortally wounded just as Eloise and Cathleen hide Meg and Fanny in a cabinet which is to be carried downstream. Leah devours the energy from the fallen spirit and uses it to save the remaining settlers, except for Will.

The film ends with the French military commander unable to believe the fantastical tale. He orders one of his men to take them away for the time being, unaware that the man has been possessed by a woodland spirit under Leah's control.

Cast

Release

Critical response

Caryn James from The New York Times gave the film a somewhat neutral review, calling it "an imagistic morality tale" and "a bizarrely fascinating story told in flashback", but also was somewhat critical saying  "If Mr. Crounse had stayed poised on the line between human reality and horrific visions of evil, he might have turned out a small masterpiece, or at least a cult film. As it is, Eyes of Fire is an ambitious idea gone haywire, as if The Scarlet Letter had zoomed into the future and collided with the movie version of The Exorcist."  Dennis Schwartz from Ozus' World Movie Reviews awarded the film a grade B. In his review, Schwartz wrote, "The arty horror pic, not for all tastes... Though it's a flawed film, its strange storyline captivated me despite such obvious flaws as the performances were mostly inadequate, the story had choppy moments and the special effects were cheesy." HorrorNews.net gave the film a positive review, calling it "creepy", and "artistically beautiful". Steven Ryder  from Critics Associated.com awarded the film 4 out of 4 stars, praising the film's atmosphere, tone, and sense of dread; writing, "[it] may not be blessed with the same production values or talent that these later films are yet the electric aura and commitment to unrelenting dread make Eyes of Fire an almost-forgotten paragon of folk horror." Author Edmund G. Bansak compared the film favorably to the films by Val Lewton, commending the film's acting, atmosphere, cinematography, and "authentic period flavor", while also noting that the film deteriorated towards the end.

Critic Judith Crist of WOR-TV was somewhat more favorable calling the film "a spook movie with a difference" while Variety praised the film's "big league special effects".

Home media
The film was released on VHS by Vestron Video on June 26, 1987.

After decades of being scantly available on home video, it was announced on August 24, 2021 that Severin Films will be releasing Eyes of Fire on Blu-ray on December 7, 2021, featuring a new 4K restoration from the original film elements. The film will also be included on Blu-ray in "All the Haunts Be Ours," a limited edition Blu-ray set by Severin featuring twenty international feature films in the folk horror genre.

References

Sources

External links
 
 
 
 

Fiction set in 1750
1983 films
1983 horror films
1983 independent films
1980s Western (genre) horror films
1980s historical horror films
1980s supernatural horror films
American independent films
American supernatural horror films
American dark fantasy films
American Western (genre) horror films
Films about Native Americans
Films scored by Brad Fiedel
Films set in the 1750s
Films set in forests
Films shot in Missouri
Films set in the Thirteen Colonies
Folk horror films
1980s English-language films
1980s American films